James Cayzer (born 1985), better known by his stage name Jaytech (not to be confused with Youtuber Jaytech) is an Australian electronic music producer, DJ, and a trained pianist.

Jaytech started producing at the age of 14, and released his first track at 16. In 2006, a remix of his track Genesis (Jimbo's Afterburner Mix) was included by Tiësto on his In Search of Sunrise 5: Los Angeles compilation. His first artist album Everything is OK was released in 2008, on Anjunadeep. It was also the first album released on that label.

His and James Grant's compilations "Anjunadeep 02" and "Anjunadeep 03" reached Number 1 in the iTunes dance chart. Mixmag called the former "the compilation of the month".

Jaytech has collaborated with artists including Steve Smith (house music vocalist), and electronic music producers such Soundprank, Tommy Murphy, and Matt Fax with their track "Aeris" described as "a truly captivating record that transcends genres" by Mixmag. He currently resides in Phoenix.

Radio 
Jaytech produces a monthly radio show and podcast. Titled "Jaytech Music", the show is syndicated to various FM and online radio stations across the globe. The show lasts for two hours, where the second hour is filled with a guest mix by a guest DJ or Music Producer.

Discography

Albums 

 Everything Is OK (23 June 2008) 
 Multiverse (31 August 2012)
 Awakening (25 November 2015)

Singles

Remixes

Compilations 
 Anjunadeep 02 (by Various Artists; mixed by Jaytech & James Grant) (22 March 2010)
 Anjunadeep 03 (by Various Artists; mixed by Jaytech & James Grant) (21 February 2011) 
 Anjunadeep 04 (by Various Artists; mixed by Jaytech & James Grant) (27 February 2012) 
 Positronic Collective (by Various Artists; mixed by Jaytech) (30 June 2015)

EPs 
 Positronic EP (7 July 2014)
 The ZeroThree EP (30 September 2016)
 Show You EP (21 March 2017)
 Positronic EP 2 (25 July 2017)
 Song Of Fire EP (13 March 2018)
 Razer EP (13 November 2018)
 Positronic EP 3 (23 January 2019)
 Feel Free EP (7 September 2020)
 Dreamworld EP (10 February 2021)
 Galactic EP (22 October 2021)

References

External links
 
 Artist Page on Anjunabeats.com
 

1985 births
Living people
Club DJs
Australian DJs
Australian record producers
Australian house musicians
Australian trance musicians
People from Canberra
Remixers
House musicians
Electronic dance music DJs
Anjunabeats artists